Stouffville GO Station is a railway station in the GO Transit network located in Stouffville, Ontario, Canada. It was the northern terminus of the Stouffville line train service until the line was extended to Lincolnville (now ) on September 2, 2008. Buses serve the station from stops on the street due to space limitations.

York-Durham Heritage Railway runs historical trains between the station and Uxbridge on summer weekends.

History

The Toronto and Nipissing Railway was completed in 1871, connecting Stouffville and Uxbridge with Toronto. The line's northeastern terminus at Coboconk, Ontario, on Balsam Lake in the Kawarthas was completed in 1872. In 1877, a second track was built from Stouffville north to Jackson's Point on Lake Simcoe. These connections were created in large part to provide a reliable and efficient means of transporting timber harvested and milled in these regions. Soon Stouffville Junction serviced thirty trains per day. The railway became the Grand Trunk Railway in 1884, and Canadian National Railways took over the line in 1914.

The original station, a converted Victorian home with annex, was demolished in the 1980s and not replaced until the current station was built for GO Transit in the 1990s. The water tower had been removed earlier but discussions continued about the fate of the 1916 Stouffville Co-op grain elevator, which needs to be relocated for GO Transit expansion. In May 2015, the grain elevator was demolished and replaced with 20 parking spaces after Metrolinx determined it was a fire hazard due to its deteriorated condition. Local preservationists were upset over the bulldozing of the 100-year-old structure.

In July 2005, the station site was expanded to include more parking in the west lot. An additional 60 surface parking spaces was added to the station in June 2016.

Connecting transit

York Region Transit
 9 9th Line eastbound to Parkview Village and westbound to Box Grove Plaza

See also
 Nineteen on the Park (c 1896)

References

External links

 York-Durham Heritage Railway
 Stouffville Community Policing Centre

GO Transit railway stations
Railway stations in the Regional Municipality of York
Railway stations in Canada opened in 1869
Canadian National Railway stations in Ontario
Transport in Whitchurch-Stouffville
Buildings and structures in Whitchurch-Stouffville
1869 establishments in Ontario